Ostfriedhof   is a cemetery in Cologne, Germany. It was established in 1946.

References

External links
 
 

Cemeteries in Cologne